Can may refer to:

Containers
 Aluminum can
 Drink can
 Oil can
 Steel and tin cans
 Trash can
 Petrol can
 Metal can (disambiguation)

Music
 Can (band), West Germany, 1968
 Can (album), 1979
 Can (South Korean band)

Other 
 Can (name), Turkish and Circassian given name and surname
 Can (verb)
 Canning of food
 River Can, Essex, UK
 Canada
 Tomato can (sports idiom)

See also
 CAN (disambiguation)
 Cann (disambiguation)
 Cans (disambiguation)
 Kan (disambiguation)